Wonder Woman (roller coaster) may refer to:
 Wonder Woman Flight of Courage at Six Flags Magic Mountain
 Wonder Woman Golden Lasso Coaster at Six Flags Fiesta Texas